Clark Davis may refer to:

 Clark Davis (wrestler) (born 1957), Canadian wrestler
 Clark Janell Davis (born 1997), American beauty pageant titleholder